Ibrahim Mashhour Al Jazi (born 1966) is a Jordanian politician who serves as Minister of State for Prime Ministry Affairs. He was appointed as minister on 12 October 2020. Jazi also served as Minister of State for Legal Affairs and as Minister of Justice in 2011 and in 2012.

Education 
Jazi holds a Master in International Law from the University of Essex and a Doctor of Philosophy in International Law from the University of London.

References 

1966 births
Living people
21st-century Jordanian politicians
Alumni of the University of Essex
Alumni of the University of London
Prime ministry affairs ministers of Jordan
Government ministers of Jordan
Justice ministers of Jordan